Now Deh-e Arbab (also Romanized as Now Deh-e Arbāb and Now Deh Arbāb; also known as Naudeh, Now Deh, and Now Deh-e Ānqolāb) is a village in Tabas Rural District, in the Central District of Khoshab County, Razavi Khorasan Province, Iran. At the 2006 census, its population was 3,896, in 1,012 families.

References 

Populated places in Khoshab County